Siviyeh (also Romanized as Sīvīyeh, Sīvyah, Sīveyeh, and Sīvīeh; also known as Satūteh and Sotūdeh) is a village in Zhavehrud Rural District, in the Central District of Kamyaran County, Kurdistan Province, Iran. At the 2006 census, its population was 36, in 12 families. The village is populated by Kurds.

References 

Towns and villages in Kamyaran County
Kurdish settlements in Kurdistan Province